Robert Vukelić (born 17 June 1986) is a Macedonian pop singer. He started his musical career in 2007. He has collaborated with several Macedonian composers, such as a Grigor Koprov, Risto Apostolov from Vodolija, Jovan Jovanov, Elvir Mekic, Hari Kotlaroski and Silvi Band.

Singles
"Ima nesto vo tebe"
"Boze vratija"
"Pukni vo srce"
"Ko magija"
"Vjerujem u ljubav"
"Vo sonista"
"Eden ubav den"
"Ti si mojot son"
"Wolf & Deks - Bezobrazno"
"Wolf - Vreme i Nevreme"

Events & Awards

 2008– “Ohrid Fest” Ohridski Festival – Ohrid, Macedonia– 3rd place and best debut
 2008- Award for Example and promoter for young children for the prevention of drug and alcohol in Macedonia
 2009– 'Srebrena Jantra” – Veliko Trnovo, Bulgaria – 2nd place
 2009- Award for humanity - of children with special needs SOS in Macedonia
 2010 - ''Internacional Festival '' - Varna ,Bulgaria – 2nd place Gramota
 2010- ''Sofia Pee (european festival) - Sofia, Bulgaria - 2nd

Biography 
Robert Vukelić is one of the best vocalists in Macedonia. He was born on June 17, 1986 in Skopje, Macedonia.

He has his first contact with music in the fifth grade in the primary school. From the seventh grade there is a period when he moves away from music due to the loss of a loved one from the family, but for that period the love for music is even greater and grows even more and there comes a period when his wish and love is realized

He started his music career at the age of 21, with some previous musical experience. He appears on the Macedonian stage for the first time with the song "Ima nesto vo tebe" which in a very short period brings him great success on radio stations and charts in all cities, the song becomes a real HIT. With this song he won many female hearts and became one of the favorite young hopeful and talented singers.

Robert in 2008 continues with his second song with which he also receives an invitation to promote it in Croatia at a major event held every year in Rijeka and attended by the biggest stars from Croatia and abroad.The same year he participated in the Ohrid Festival with the song "Ti si mojot son", which placed in the finals and won 2nd place among 36 compositions, and was also rated among the best songs of the festival

In his short and fruitful career, in addition to the specific color of his voice and the extraordinary power of interpretation and as the author of his songs, Robert stands out with his humanitarian activities and work in the field of improvement and protection of young people in Macedonia. He has been named an honorary member of several projects, and also a major promoter and example for young people in Macedonia.

References 

 Robert Vukelić biography on Facebook

External links

 

 
Taratur.com
Muzika24.com.mk
Dnevnik.com.mk
Time.mk
Vecer.com.mk
Dnevnik.com.mk
Dnevnik.com.mk
Radiolinden.com.au
Mkd.mk
Vest.com.mk

Living people
21st-century Macedonian male singers
Musicians from Skopje
1986 births